Herman Tønnessen (24 July 1918 – 2001) was a Norwegian–Canadian philosopher and writer. Having studied with Arne Næss, in the years following the end of World War II he was affiliated with the Norwegian Institute for Social Research.

In 1957 he became a professor of philosophy at the University of California, USA, a position he held until 1961, when he relocated to the University of Alberta, Canada.

His primary influences were the pessimistic ideals of German philosopher Arthur Schopenhauer and Norwegian biosophist Peter Wessel Zapffe.

In his essay Happiness Is for the Pigs: Philosophy versus Psychotherapy (1966), he formulated his attempt to "out-Zapffe Zapffe", in rejecting the former's metaphysical theory that life is meaningless, and as a response to Zapffe's claim stated that life is not even meaningless. This idea is further elaborated in the book I Choose Truth (Jeg velger sannheten (1983)), a dialogue between Tønnessen and Zapffe in which they discuss the existential condition of humankind.

External links

Philpapers – Works by Herman Tennessen

University of California faculty
1918 births
2001 deaths
Anti-natalists
20th-century Norwegian philosophers